Kuman (also Chimbu or Simbu) is a language of Chimbu Province, Papua New Guinea. In 1994, it was estimated that 80,000 people spoke Kuman, 10,000 of them monolinguals; in the 2000 census, 115,000 were reported, with few monolinguals. Ethnologue also reported 70,000 second language speakers in 2021.

Phonology
Like other Chimbu languages, Kuman has rather unusual lateral consonants. Besides the typical , it has a "laterally released velar affricate" which is voiced medially and voiceless finally (and does not occur initially). Based on related languages, this is presumably , allophonically  (see voiceless velar lateral fricative).

Consonants 

 Voiced plosives are usually prenasal, but may fluctuate in word-initial position as ordinary voiced stops .
 Voiceless stops  are always aspirated  in word-initial position.
  only occurs word-medially and word-finally. In word-final position it is heard as a trill .
  can be pronounced as  before front vowels .
  is heard as voiceless  or fricative , when preceding a consonant. It is heard as a voiced fricative  when between vowels. It is also heard as an alveolar fricative  before an /s/.

Vowels 

 /a/ can be heard as either central  or back  in free variation.
 /o/ is pronounced in its lax form as  before /ɾ/.

Grammar
Kuman is an SOV language.

Vocabulary
The following basic vocabulary words are from Salisbury (1956) and Trefry (1969), as cited in the Trans-New Guinea database:

{| class="wikitable sortable"
! gloss !! Kuman
|-
! head
| bit-na; bɩtiɩno
|-
! hair
| iŋguno; yungo
|-
! ear
| kina-na; kunano
|-
! eye
| gumutino; ongomit-na
|-
! nose
| guma-ne; gumano
|-
! tooth
| siŋguno
|-
! tongue
| dirambino
|-
! leg
| kati; kat-na
|-
! louse
| numan
|-
! dog
| aʝg; agi; akɬ ̥
|-
! pig
| bogla; bugɬa
|-
! bird
| kua
|-
! egg
| mugɬo; muɬo
|-
! blood
| borɔmai; bořumai; maiam
|-
! bone
| yambiřo; yombura
|-
! skin
| gaŋgino
|-
! breast
| amu-na; amuno
|-
! tree
| endi
|-
! man
| yagl; yakɬ ̥
|-
! woman
| ambu
|-
! sun
| ande; andesuŋgua
|-
! moon
| ba
|-
! water
| nigl; nikɬ ̥
|-
! fire
| baugl; doŋga
|-
! stone
| kombuglo; kombugɬo
|-
! road, path
| konbo; konumbo
|-
! name
| kaŋgin; kangi-ne
|-
! eat
| neuŋgua
|-
! one
| suařa
|-
! two
| suo
|}

References

Further reading
Hardie, Peter. 2003. Is Kuman Tonal? An account of basic segmental and tonological structure in the Papuan language Kuman. MA thesis: Australian National University

External links 
 Kuman phonology and sample text
 Kaipuleohone has a Chimbu-Wahgi collection from Andrea L. Berez that includes Kuman language materials
 A number of collections in Paradisec include Kuman materials

Languages of Simbu Province
Languages of Eastern Highlands Province
Chimbu–Wahgi languages
Subject–object–verb languages